Joan and Leslie was an Australian situation comedy series which screened on the Seven Network between 1969 and 1970. It was an adaption of a UK television series also known as Joan and Leslie, which had not screened in Australia.

Cast
 Joan Reynolds as Joan Randall 
 Leslie Randall as Leslie Randall
 Stan Penrose as Merv Kelly
 Leila Blake as Gina Cotter

See also 
 List of Australian television series
 Joan and Leslie

Notes

External links 
 
 Joan and Leslie Classic Australian TV

Australian television sitcoms
Seven Network original programming
Television shows set in New South Wales
1969 Australian television series debuts
1970 Australian television series endings
Black-and-white Australian television shows